Previle may refer to:

Previle (former municipality), Yugoslavia
Previle, Haiti